Scolytus mali, known generally as larger shothole borer, is a species of typical bark beetle in the family Curculionidae. Other common names include the apple bark beetle and large fruit bark beetle. It is found in North America.

References

Further reading

 
 
 

Scolytinae
Articles created by Qbugbot
Beetles described in 1805